The Military ranks of Gabon are the military insignia used by the Armed Forces of Gabon. Being a former colony of France, Gabon shares a rank structure similar to that of France.

Commissioned officer ranks
The rank insignia of commissioned officers.

Obsolete ranks

Other ranks
The rank insignia of non-commissioned officers and enlisted personnel.

References

External links
 
 

Gabon
Military of Gabon